Matúš Mikuš (born 8 July 1991) is a Slovak football forward who plays for Austrian club SC/ESV Parndorf.

Career
In January 2013, he signed a contract with the Austrian Bundesliga club Admira Wacker Mödling. He left them in December 2013.

FK Pohronie
Mikuš had signed with Pohronie at the end of February 2020. At the time, Pohronie was the last team of the Fortuna Liga table. He had signed the club as a free agent. Previously, during the autumn part of the season, he was featured in two fixtures of Nitra, who was ranked 11 of 12 for the most of the season.

Mikuš made his debut for Pohronie in the first available fixture, on 1 March 2020, in a home fixture against Senica. Mikuš came on as a replacement for Roland Gerebenits in the 66th minute and played as a secondary striker. Despite multiple chances on both sides and partly owing to the difficult terrain, the game concluded in a goal-less tie, allowing the home side to equal Nitra in the table, achieving their 16th point in the season.

After the season, in which Pohronie managed to avoid relegation from the Fortuna Liga, Mikuš was let go from the club.

SC/ESV Parndorf
In 2021, Mikuš joined Austrian club SC/ESV Parndorf.

References

External links
FC Nitra profile 

1991 births
Living people
Sportspeople from Topoľčany
Association football forwards
Slovak footballers
Slovakia youth international footballers
Slovakia under-21 international footballers
FC Nitra players
FC Admira Wacker Mödling players
Bohemians 1905 players
FK Železiarne Podbrezová players
FK Pohronie players
SC-ESV Parndorf 1919 players
Austrian Football Bundesliga players
Czech First League players
Slovak Super Liga players
Austrian Landesliga players
Expatriate footballers in Austria
Expatriate footballers in the Czech Republic
Slovak expatriate sportspeople in Austria
Slovak expatriate sportspeople in the Czech Republic